Caristanius minimus is a species of snout moth in the genus Caristanius. It was described by Herbert H. Neunzig in 1977, and is only known from southern Florida, United States.

There appear to be several generations per year.

The larvae feed on Cassia keyensis. The larvae create larval shelters, mostly in the upper part of the host plant, but sometimes also near the base. Pupation takes place in the soil in a silken case.

References

Moths described in 1977
Phycitinae